Dorudzan Rural District is a rural district (dehestan) in Dorudzan District, Marvdasht County, Fars Province, Iran. At the 2006 census, its population was 11,470, in 2,683 families.  The rural district has 15 villages.

References 

Rural Districts of Fars Province
Marvdasht County